Tiernavia is a monospecific genus of probable metazoan interpreted as a coelenterate (or even a cnidarian). It is known from the Cambrian (Ovetian, Lower Cambrian), and is preserved as casts in the Torreárboles Formation in the Sierra de Córdoba, Spain.

References

Prehistoric cnidarian genera
Monotypic prehistoric animal genera
Cambrian animals

Cambrian genus extinctions